Dušica Žegarac (15 April 1944 – 24 May 2019) was a Serbian film and television actress. She began acting in 1960 and her first appearance was in France Štiglic's film The Ninth Circle (Deveti krug), for which she won the Golden Arena for Best Actress at the Pula Film Festival, the Yugoslav national film awards.

She won her second Golden Arena for starring in 's 1971 film .

In 2014, Žegarac's memoir Kao na filmu was released.

References

External links

1944 births
2019 deaths
Actresses from Belgrade
Serbian film actresses
Serbian television actresses
Serbian child actresses
Yugoslav film actresses
Yugoslav television actresses
Yugoslav child actresses
Golden Arena winners